"Jesse" is a song written and performed by American singer-songwriter Carly Simon. Produced by Mike Mainieri, the song served as the lead single from Simon's ninth studio album, Come Upstairs (1980).

The song is told in first-person about the narrator's disdain for her former lover, Jesse, who has just moved back to town. She vows to have nothing to do with him, "Don't let him near me, don't let him touch me, don't let him please me," she sings. She asks her friends to remind her of how he has wronged her, because she fears she'll end up letting her guard down and fall back under his spell. She ends up going back on her promise to herself and the two rekindle their romance. "Jesse, quick come here, I won't tell a soul", "Jesse, that you've come back to me, my friends will all say 'She's gone again'", she sings. She then seeks to comfort her friends because they don't approve. "My friends, let's comfort them, they're feeling bad, they think I've sunk so low," she sings.

Simon's then-husband, James Taylor, and their daughter, Sally Taylor, sing backup vocals. The single has a country-pop flair, unlike the rest of the album, which is more rock oriented.

Chart performance and critical reception
"Jesse" was a major success, staying on the US charts for six months; it peaked at No. 11 on the Billboard Hot 100 and No. 8 on the Billboard Adult Contemporary chart. It also hit No. 9 on the Cash Box top singles chart. The single was officially certified Gold by the Recording Industry Association of America (RIAA), Simon's fourth single to achieve this feat, signifying sales of one million copies in the US. The single was also a hit in Australia, peaking at No. 4 on the Kent Music Report, becoming Simon's biggest hit there since "You're So Vain." It also peaked at No. 12 in Canada, making it her 11th Top 40 hit there. One of her biggest hits; Simon has included the song on several of her compilations, including the three-disc box set Clouds in My Coffee (1995), the 2-disc retrospective Anthology (2002), and the single-disc Reflections: Carly Simon's Greatest Hits (2004).

According to Billboard, "the melody is simple yet powerful, the words are complex and Simon's voice has never been better." Cash Box said that the song "embodies the push and pull of love, the ailment and the cure - the person we try to resist but cannot."  Record World said that "Carly offers a slick, bouncy package about a onesided love that won't go away." In a retrospective review for AllMusic, William Ruhlmann called the track "the album's highlight" and declared it "Simon's best-written pop/rock song since ‘You're So Vain’ and a Top Ten hit to boot."

Track listing
7" single
 "Jesse" – 4:15
 "Stardust" – 4:13

Personnel

Charts

Weekly charts

Year-end charts

Live performances
Despite the massive critical and commercial of success of "Jesse", as well as Simon making official music videos for tracks from her previous album Spy (1979), an official video was never made for the song. Simon has performed it in many of her concerts, including two in which it was filmed: Live at Grand Central in 1995 and A Moonlight Serenade on the Queen Mary 2 in 2005.

References

External links
 Carly Simon's Official Website
 YouTube - Simon performing Jesse on the Queen Mary 2 in 2005

1980 songs
Songs written by Carly Simon
Carly Simon songs
Warner Records singles